Palumbia inflata is a species of hoverfly in the family Syrphidae.

Distribution
North America.

References

Eristalinae
Insects described in 1834
Diptera of North America
Taxa named by Pierre-Justin-Marie Macquart